P2Y purinoceptor 14 is a protein that in humans is encoded by the P2RY14 gene.

The product of this gene, P2Y14 belongs to the family of G-protein coupled receptors, which contains several receptor subtypes with different pharmacological selectivity for various adenosine and uridine nucleotides. This receptor is a P2Y purinergic receptor for UDP-glucose and other UDP-sugars coupled to G-proteins. It has been implicated in extending the known immune system functions of P2Y receptors by participating in the regulation of the stem cell compartment, and it may also play a role in neuroimmune function. Two transcript variants encoding the same protein have been identified for this gene.

See also
 P2Y receptor

References

Further reading

External links

G protein-coupled receptors